Russia-2 was a former Russian television channel operated by VGTRK. It primarily broadcast sport.

Between 2007 and 2009 during the daytime, it broadcast the children's channel called Bibigon.

Before January 1, 2010, it was known as Sport, but since then it was re-branded due to a broadened format.

On 1 November 2015 the channel was closed and its broadcasting frequency was taken by a new sports television channel Match TV.

Programmes

News and current affairs 
 Bol`shoy sport (Big sport) — sports news.

Documentaries 
 Moya Planeta (My Planet) - blocks of programmes from Moya Planeta.
 Nauka 2.0 (Science 2.0) - blocks of programmes from Nauka 2.0.

Others 
 Feature films (thrillers and adventures)
 90x60x90 (entertainment)

Sports events broadcast by channel 
 Biathlon World Cup
 FIA Formula One World Championship
 KHL
 Premier League
 Russian Premier League
 The FA Cup
 M-1 Global, UFC, Bellator MMA, ONE Championship, and other MMA Promotions

External links

Defunct television channels in Russia
Television channels and stations established in 2010
Television channels and stations disestablished in 2015
2010 establishments in Russia
2015 disestablishments in Russia
Sports television networks in Russia
Russian-language television stations